The Robotis Bioloid (stylized as ROBOTIS BIOLOID) is a hobbyist and educational robot kit produced by the South Korean robot manufacturer Robotis. The Bioloid platform consists of components and small, modular servomechanisms called the AX-12A Dynamixels, which can be used in a daisy-chained fashion to construct robots of various configurations, such as wheeled, legged, or humanoid robots. The Robot is programmed with RoboPlus, C (programming language) based software. The Bioloid system is thus comparable to the Lego Mindstorms, and VEX Robotics VEXplorer kits.

Kit types
There are multiple variations of the Bioloid kit:
 Robotis Bioloid Beginner – includes parts and designs for 14 robot types; discontinued
 Robotis Bioloid Comprehensive – includes parts and designs for 26 robot types; discontinued
 Robotis Bioloid Expert – designed for education or research use; discontinued
 Robotis Bioloid Premium – upgraded and latest version of Bioloid Comprehensive Kit builds 29 different configurations
 Robotis Bioloid GP – intended for robot competitions
 Robotis Darwin-Mini Humanoid Robot – 3d printed shell allows infinite customization options
 Robotis Bioloid STEM Standard – includes parts and designs for 7 robot types
 Robotis Bioloid STEM Expansion – includes parts and designs for 9 robot types; requires purchase of STEM Standard

TurtleBot 3 and other platforms
Turtlebot 3, announced in 2016 and developed in collaboration with Robotis and the Open Source Robotics Foundation, is the smallest and cheapest of the TurtleBots.

Other Robotis platforms include: Robotis OP 2, Robotis Manipulator, and ThorMang3.

TB3 plug-ins for Gazebo
Robotis has TurtleBot3 plug-ins for the Gazebo robotics simulator that allow simulating a TB3 Burger, Waffle, or Waffle Pi.

Applications
The platform is currently in use by the U.S. Naval Academy in their mechanical engineering courses, and is also popular in the RoboCup international robotics competition  and FIRA competition.

See also
TurtleBot
DARwIn-OP now known as Robotis OP2

References

Robot kits
Bipedal humanoid robots
Robotics at ROBOTIS
2000s robots